Blomfield is a surname. Notable people with the surname include:

Alfred Blomfield, English bishop
Arthur Blomfield, English architect
Charles Blomfield (disambiguation), several people
David Blomfield, English local politician, writer, book editor and local historian
Derek Blomfield, English actor
Dorothy Blomfield (later Dorothy Gurney), English poet
Edward Valentine Blomfield, classical scholar
Ezekiel Blomfield, English congregational minister
Francis Blomfield, English cricketer
James Blomfield, Canadian artist
Paloma Faith Blomfield, English soul and pop artist
Paul Blomfield, English politician
(Lady) Sara Blomfield, English writer
Reginald Blomfield, English architect
Thomas Valentine Blomfield, British soldier and pioneer New South Wales settler and pastoralist
William Blomfield, New Zealand cartoonist

See also
Blomefield (surname)